Benjamin LeSage (born 24 November 1995) is a Canadian rugby union player who plays as a centre for the New England Free Jacks in Major League Rugby (MLR) and for Canada internationally. He previously played for the Toronto Arrows and the LA Giltinis

He is the son of Margaret and Bernard LeSage and an older brother to Natalie LeSage. He was included in the Canadian squad for the 2019 Rugby World Cup which is held in Japan for the first time and also marks his first World Cup appearance.

Early life and education 
LeSage hails from Calgary, Alberta. He attended Dr. E.P. Scarlett High School but ended up playing rugby for the Henry Wisewood Warriors, winning Athlete of the Year upon graduation. After graduating, LeSage enrolled at the University of British Columbia where, alongside playing varsity rugby with the UBC Thunderbirds, he completed a Bachelor of Applied Science in Mechatronics, Robotics, and Automation Engineering. He is a member of the Sigma Chi Fraternity.

Career 
He made his international debut for Canada against Romania on 19 November 2016. He made his first World Cup match appearance against Italy on 26 September 2019 in Canada's opening match of the tournament in Pool B. The match ended up in a losing cause for Canada, where Italy thrashed them in a one sided contest by scoring 48–7.

In his free time, Ben works for up and the coming global employment startup - Omnipresent.

Club statistics

References 

1995 births
Living people
Canada international rugby union players
Canadian rugby union players
Rugby union centres
Sportspeople from Calgary
Prairie Wolf Pack players
Toronto Arrows players
LA Giltinis players
New England Free Jacks players